The Blood Knight is a fantasy novel by Greg Keyes. It's a sequel to The Charnel Prince and the third book of The Kingdoms of Thorn and Bone.

Plot summary

In this third novel of the series, Anne Dare continues her flight from her Uncle's minions, with the help of the dessrator Cazio and the knight Sir Neil MeqVren. The Holter Aspar White and the monk Stephen Darige continue on their own path, attempting to unravel the mysteries of the Briar King. Anne's mother, Queen Muriele, remains imprisoned by the usurper, Robert, while the musician Leoff engages in a dangerous game of deceit with Robert, attempting to recreate a lost dark art.

External links
 Greg Keyes Official Site
 Summary at Del Rey Online
 SFFWorld.com Review

American fantasy novels
Novels by J. Gregory Keyes
2006 American novels
Del Rey books